Minister of Foreign Affairs of the Republic of Madagascar is a government minister in charge of the Ministry of Foreign Affairs of Madagascar, responsible for conducting foreign relations of the country.

The following is a list of foreign ministers of Madagascar since its founding in 1960:

References

Foreign
Foreign Ministers
Politicians